Peter Jonas (born 18 June 1941) is an Austrian former figure skater. He is the 1965 European bronze medalist. He represented Austria at the 1960 Winter Olympics, where he placed 13th, and at the 1964 Winter Olympics, where he placed 7th.

Competitive highlights

References

Navigation

1941 births
Living people
Austrian male single skaters
Olympic figure skaters of Austria
Figure skaters at the 1960 Winter Olympics
Figure skaters at the 1964 Winter Olympics
Figure skaters from Vienna
European Figure Skating Championships medalists